Lake Waingaro is a lake in the Northland Region of New Zealand. The lake is a main supply of water for the Kerikeri Town Water Supply.

See also
List of lakes in New Zealand

References

Waingaro
Far North District